Minuscule 175 (in the Gregory-Aland numbering), δ 95 (Soden), is a Greek minuscule manuscript of the New Testament, on parchment. Palaeographically it has been assigned  to the 12th century. It has marginalia.

Description 

The codex contains almost complete text of the New Testament on 247 parchment leaves (size ), with only one lacuna (Matthew 1:1-4:17). 

The text is written in one column per page, in 35–37 lines per page (size of text 16.9 by 10.5 cm), in brown ink. 

The Book of Revelation is placed between Acts of the Apostles and Catholic epistles (see Minuscule 627). The Pauline epistles follow Catholic epistles. It contains scholia to the Acts, some marginal corrections made by prima manu (e.g. Luke 24:13). The Pauline epistles have the Euthalian subscriptions. It has margin notes in uncial script to the Acts of Apostles.

Text 

According to Hermann von Soden in the Acts and epistles the text of the manuscript is a representative of the Byzantine text-type. Kurt Aland did not place it in any Category.
According to the Claremont Profile Method it represents textual family Πa in Luke 1, Luke 10, and Luke 20.

History 

This codex, together with 173, 174, 176, and 177, was brought from the Library of the Basilian monks.

It was examined by Bianchini, Birch (about 1782), and Scholz. C. R. Gregory saw the manuscript in 1886. 

It is currently housed at the Vatican Library (Vat. gr. 2080), at Rome.

See also 
 List of New Testament minuscules
 Biblical manuscript
 Textual criticism

References

Further reading

External links 
 Minuscule 175 at the Encyclopedia of Textual Criticism

Greek New Testament minuscules
11th-century biblical manuscripts
Manuscripts of the Vatican Library